Levert Manje (born 28 June 2001) is a South African cricketer. He made his first-class debut on 13 February 2020, for Gauteng in the 2019–20 CSA 3-Day Provincial Cup. Prior to his first-class debut, he was named in South Africa's squad for the 2020 Under-19 Cricket World Cup. He made his List A debut on 22 March 2021, for Gauteng in the 2020–21 CSA Provincial One-Day Challenge.

In April 2021, he was named in Gauteng's squad, ahead of the 2021–22 cricket season in South Africa.

References

External links
 

2001 births
Living people
South African cricketers
Gauteng cricketers
Place of birth missing (living people)